Cychrus kralianus is a species of ground beetle in the subfamily of Carabinae. It was described by Deuve in 1996.

References

kralianus
Beetles described in 1996